Guy Whitmore is a composer specializing in video game music, notable for creating the soundtracks to Captain Claw, Die Hard: Nakatomi Plaza, Russian Squares, Peggle 2, Shivers, Shivers II: Harvest of Souls, Blood, Blood II: The Chosen, Shogo: Mobile Armor Division and No One Lives Forever. He is the co-founder of a music production company called Music Design Network, and a founding member of the Seattle Composers Alliance.

Guy Whitmore has specialized in creating "adaptive music" for video games, using techniques such as cross-fading, location-based music, and techniques to render music "on-the-fly" rather than using "pre-rendered" linear tracks.

External links
Composer profile at OverClocked ReMix
Interview with Guy Whitmore on adaptive music
Blood Wiki article

Year of birth missing (living people)
American company founders
Living people
Monolith Productions people
Sierra On-Line employees
Video game composers